Acartus subinermis is a species of beetle in the family Cerambycidae. It was described by Lepesme and Breuning in 1957.

References

Beetles described in 1957
Acartus